Roddrick Muckelroy (born October 27, 1986) is a former American football linebacker in the National Football League (NFL). He was selected by the Cincinnati Bengals in the fourth round of the 2010 NFL Draft. He played college football for the University of Texas at Austin. Prior to that he attended Hallsville High School.

College career
Muckelroy graduated in December 2008 with a degree in corporate communications. In the 2008 Season, he led the Longhorns in tackles with 114.

Professional career

Cincinnati Bengals
He was selected in the fourth round of the 2010 NFL Draft with the 131st overall pick.

During the team's first training camp practice in 2011, Muckelroy ruptured his Achilles tendon, ending his season. Just before the start of the 2012 regular season, Muckelroy was released in favor of undrafted Linebacker Vontaze Burfict.

Muckelroy was re-signed by the Bengals on September 14 after Linebacker Thomas Howard was placed on injured reserve, but was released again shortly thereafter.

Washington Redskins
Muckelroy was signed by the Washington Redskins on November 26, 2012. He was released in August 2013.

Personal life
Muckelroy is the cousin of former NFL player, Joe King.

References

External links
Texas Longhorns Bio
Cincinnati Bengals Bio

1986 births
Living people
American football linebackers
Cincinnati Bengals players
People from Hallsville, Texas
People from Longview, Texas
Players of American football from Texas
Texas Longhorns football players
Washington Redskins players